Elecussa is a monotypic moth genus of the family Erebidae. Its only species, Elecussa displosa, is found in Costa Rica. Both the genus and the species were first described by William Schaus in 1912.

References

Calpinae
Monotypic moth genera